Spatalla curvifolia, the white-stalked spoon, is a flower-bearing shrub that forms part of the fynbos. The plant is native to the Western Cape, South Africa.

Description
The plant dies after a fire but the seeds survive. The plant is bisexual and pollinated by insects. Two months after the plant has flowered, the ripe seeds fall to the ground where they are spread by ants.

Distribution and habitat
The plant occurs from Kogelberg to Bredasdorp.

References

External links
Threatened Species Programme | SANBI Red List of South African Plants
Spatalla curvifolia (White-stalked spoon)
Uni Spoons
Uni Spoons bl. 96

curvifolia